Soft De (Ꙣ ꙣ; italics: Ꙣ ꙣ) is a letter of the Cyrillic script.

Soft De was sometimes used in the Old Church Slavonic language to represent the sound [].

Computing codes

See also
Cyrillic characters in Unicode
Cyrillization of Arabic